Cubana de Aviación Flight 493, registration  was a Douglas DC-4 en route from Miami, Florida, to Havana, Cuba, on April 25, 1951. A US Navy Beechcraft SNB-1 Kansan, BuNo 39939, was on an instrument training flight in the vicinity of Naval Air Station Key West, Florida, at the same time. The two aircraft collided in mid-air over Key West, killing all 43 aboard both aircraft.

Flight history

Flight 493 departed Miami at 11:09 a.m. that day and was cleared to climb to 4,000 feet on a direct heading to Key West. Approximately ten minutes later, the SNB-1 took off from Key West NAS for simulated instrument training. Although the flight was not cleared to a specific altitude or heading, standard instrument training procedures were in place. At 11:49 a.m. Flight 493, heading south, and the SNB-1, heading west, collided over the Key West NAS at an estimated altitude of 4,000 feet.

Investigation

Civil Aeronautics Authority (CAA) investigators determined that there were no mechanical problems with either aircraft. Both were operating under visual flight rules, as the weather at the time of the crash was clear and calm. The probable cause of the accident was given by the CAA as a failure on the parts of both air crews to exercise due vigilance in looking for and avoiding conflicting traffic. The CAA also called for a review of air traffic control procedures.

See also

 Aviation safety
 Cubana de Aviación accidents and incidents
 List of accidents and incidents involving commercial aircraft

External links and references
 Civil Aeronautics Board Aircraft Accident Report on the collision (Archive)
 
  (plaintext)

 (plaintext)

  (plaintext)

Airliner accidents and incidents in Florida
Aviation accidents and incidents in the United States in 1951
Mid-air collisions
Mid-air collisions involving airliners
Mid-air collisions involving military aircraft
Accidents and incidents involving the Douglas DC-4
Accidents and incidents involving the Beechcraft Model 18
493
Cuba–United States relations
History of Key West, Florida
1951 in Florida
April 1951 events in the United States